The 3rd Goya Awards were presented in Madrid, Spain on 21 March 1989.

Women on the Verge of a Nervous Breakdown won the award for Best Film.

Winners and nominees

Major award nominees

Other award nominees

Honorary Goya
 Imperio Argentina

See also 
 List of Spanish films of 1988

References

External links
Official website (Spanish)
IMDb profile 

03
1988 film awards
1988 in Spanish cinema